Dão is a Portuguese river that originates in the plateau regions of Trancoso-Aguiar da Beira in the Eirado parish, Aguiar da Beira Municipality, Guarda District, and varies between  in elevation.

It flows in a general northeast–southwest direction, passing through Barragem de Fagilde and crosses or demarcates the limits of the councils of Aguiar da Beira, Penalva do Castelo, Mangualde, Viseu, Carregal do Sal, Nelas, Tondela, and Santa Comba Dão.

Its granite-sloped valley is situated in the "Região Demarcada do Dão", where the Vinho do Dão wines are produced.

References

Rivers of Portugal